The Elachistidae (grass-miner moths) are a family of small moths in the superfamily Gelechioidea. Some authors lump about 3,300 species in eight subfamilies here, but this arrangement almost certainly results in a massively paraphyletic and completely unnatural assemblage, united merely by symplesiomorphies retained from the first gelechioid moths.

In fact, most of these moths appear to be either closer to the Oecophorinae and are hence nowadays usually included in the Oecophoridae (Depressariinae, "Deuterogoniinae", Hypertrophinae, Stenomatinae and perhaps the enigmatic Aeolanthes), or constitute quite basal lineages of gelechioids, neither closely related to Elachista nor to Oecophora, and hence best treated as independent families within the Gelechioidea (Agonoxenidae, Ethmiidae). The genus Coelopoeta is sometimes still placed here, but probably belongs in the Oecophorinae.

Consequently, the Elachistidae are essentially identical to the subfamily Elachistinae in the family's wide circumscription. The Agonoxenidae might perhaps belong here regardless, but even this is doubtful. Nonetheless, a considerable number of genera remain in the present family, and eventually it is likely that subdivisions will again be established (e.g. by raising some or all of the tribes proposed for the former Elachistinae to subfamily status).

A significant reduction of genera has been proposed, from the current mass of 20 genera to 3. The proposition was made on the premise of several distinguishing classifications, all of which are synapomorphies. Those include genital size and presence of digitate, adult abdomen segments without dorsal spines, absence of maxillary palpi and fronto-clypeal suture, and immobile abdominal segments in pupae and larvae. Various tribes were considered within the proposition, with most differentiation coming from genital structure.

In the modern, reduced description, the Elachistidae are small to very small moths (wingspans usually around 1 cm). Their wings appear feather-like due to the fine hair covering the wings' fringes, and the hindwings can be significantly reduced in area, essentially consisting of a small strip with a wide hairy fringe. The caterpillars are typically leaf miners or stem miners on Poales.

Genera
The genera of Elachistidae are:

Elachistinae
Elachista
Eretmograptis Meyrick, 1938
Mylocrita Meyrick, 1922
Myrrhinitis Meyrick, 1913
Perittia Stainton, 1854
Stephensia Stainton, 1858
Urodeta Stainton, 1869

Several small genera colored by some authors are here included in Elachista, as it would otherwise be liable to be non-monophyletic. As noted above, Aeolanthes may also belong here, as the only genus of a subfamily Aeolanthinae. Also possibly included is the Peruvian species Auxotricha ochrogypsa, described by Edward Meyrick in 1931 as the sole member of its genus.

Parametriotinae Capuse, 1971
Agonoxeninae Meyrick, 1925 (alternatively treated as a separate family)

Fossil record
Some prehistoric genera of Elachistidae, known only from fossils, have been described:
 †Elachistites Kozlov, 1987
 †Microperittia Kozlov, 1987
 †Palaeoelachista Kozlov, 1987
 †Praemendesia Kozlov, 1987

Former genera

 Annetennia Traugott-Olsen, 1995
 Aristoptila Meyrick, 1932
 Atmozostis Meyrick, 1932
 Atrinia Sinev, 1992
 Austriana Traugott-Olsen, 1995
 Atmozostis Meyrick, 1932
 Bradleyana Traugott-Olsen, 1995
 Calamograptis Meyrick, 1937 (Tineidae)
 Canariana Traugott-Olsen, 1995
 Cryphioxena Meyrick, 1921 (Bucculatricidae)
 Dicasteris Meyrick, 1906
 Dicranoctetes Braun, 1918
 Elachistoides Sruoga, 1992
 Eupneusta Bradley, 1974
 Gibraltarensis Traugott-Olsen, 1996
 Habeleria Traugott-Olsen, 1995
 Holstia Traugott-Olsen, 1995
 Illantis Meyrick, 1921
 Kumia Falkovich, 1986

 Kuznetzoviana Traugott-Olsen, 1996
 Mendesina de Joannis, 1902
 Microplitica Meyrick, 1935
 Ogmograptis Meyrick, 1935 (Bucculatricidae)
 Paraperittia Rebel, 1916
 Perittoides Sinev, 1992
 Petrochroa Busck, 1914
 Phaneroctena A.J.Turner, 1923 (Cosmopterigidae)
 Phthinostoma Meyrick, 1914
 Polymetis Walsingham, 1908
 Proterochyta Meyrick, 1918 (Scythrididae)
 Sineviana Traugott-Olsen, 1995
 Sruogania Traugott-Olsen, 1995
 Symphoristis Meyrick, 1918
 Whitebreadia Traugott-Olsen, 1995

Footnotes

References

 See also Gelechioidea Talk page for comparison of some approaches to gelechioid systematics and taxonomy.
  (2004): Markku Savela's Lepidoptera and some other life forms – Elachistidae. Version of 2004-OCT-03. Retrieved 2010-APR-21.
  (1999): Phylogeny and classification of the Elachistidae s.s. (Lepidoptera: Gelechioidea); Phylogeny and classification. Retrieved 2 November 2010.

 
Moth families